Mukdenia is a genus of plants in the saxifrage family, Saxifragaceae, consisting of 2 species. They are native to woodland areas of east Asia and Japan.

References

Saxifragaceae
Saxifragaceae genera